The Western Arctic National Parklands describes four United States National Park Service units in western Alaska that are managed by a single park superintendent and their staff. The western Arctic parklands are Kobuk Valley National Park, Noatak National Preserve, Cape Krusenstern National Monument, and Bering Land Bridge National Preserve. Bering Land Bridge National Preserve has administrative offices in Nome.

References